FK Borac Šamac (Serbian Cyrillic: ФК Борац Шaмaц) is a football club from the town of Šamac, in northern Bosnia and Herzegovina. The club competes in the Second League of the Republika Srpska (Group West).

Club records

Za Šamčane nastupaju
Marijan Maslić,
Dušan Bijelić,
Perica Mićić,
Dejan Limić,
Boris Marinković,
Zoran Perić,
Janko Dujmušić,
Gabrijel Blagojević,
Perica Maksimović,
Miloš Ilić,
Jovan Sjenčić,
Ognjen Nišić,
Bernard Majić,
Petar Marčeta,
Bojan Jaćimović,
Rajko Đurić,
Darko Đurić,
Stojan Stanković,
Kristijan Vakić,
Bojan Pupčević,
Milan Ilić,
Nikola Dakić i
Sergej Bukva.

Notable players
For the list of former and current players with Wikipedia article, please see :Category:FK Borac Šamac players.

Historical list of managers 

 Dževad Bekić
 Rade Vasiljević
 Slaviša Božičić (2006–2007)
 Mladen Radović
 Branislav Berjan (2007-2008)
 Predrag Lukić (2014-2016)
 Zoran Pupčević (2017)
 Dragan Savić (2017)
 Nikola Nikić (2017-2018)
 Mitar Lukić (2019–)

References

External links
Official website 
Club at BiHsoccer.

Football clubs in Republika Srpska
Football clubs in Bosnia and Herzegovina
Association football clubs established in 1919
Šamac, Bosnia and Herzegovina
1919 establishments in Bosnia and Herzegovina